This is a list of busiest London Underground stations for the 2021 calendar year. The dataset records patterns of mobility during the second year of the COVID-19 pandemic in the United Kingdom, with significantly reduced levels of mobility when compared with the 2019 data. Extended periods of significantly reduced commuting and other travel caused many major central London stations to drop in the ranking during 2020 and for larger suburban stations to replace them. With pandemic restrictions eliminated during the year, this was reversed during 2021.

The London Underground is a rapid transit system in the United Kingdom that serves London and the neighbouring counties of Essex, Hertfordshire and Buckinghamshire. Its first section opened in 1863. In 2021 the system had 272 stations. In 2021, King's Cross St Pancras was the busiest station on the network, used by over 36.73 million passengers, while Kensington (Olympia) was the least used, with 34,499 passengers. Data for 2021 was published on 17 May 2022 and was revised on 8 July 2022.

This table shows the busiest stations with over 14 million entries and exits in 2021.

See also
List of busiest London Underground stations (2020)
List of busiest London Underground stations (2019)
List of London Underground stations
List of busiest railway stations in Great Britain

Notes

References

Busiest London Underground stations
Busiest London Underground stations